This is a list of MPs who lost their seat at the 1997 general election. In total, 133 MPs lost their seats. Many Conservative MPs were defeated by Blair Babes.

List

References 

1997 United Kingdom general election
Lists of British MPs who were defeated by election